Everton Fox (born 1964 in Cambridge, England) is a British weather presenter, currently working for Al Jazeera English and is notable for being the first ever black weather-presenter to appear on the BBC.

Career
Everton A. Fox worked for the then Department of Social Security as a civil servant and in 1991 joined the Met Office, completing the forecaster foundation programme in March 2000. He joined the BBC Weather Centre in 2000, working initially on BBC World and BFBS television. He went on to become Radio Five Live's main weather forecaster, and also appeared regularly on BBC News 24 and BBC World.

He left the BBC Weather Centre in February 2007 to join Al Jazeera English.

References

External links
Al Jazeera CV
BBC CV 

1964 births
Al Jazeera people
BBC weather forecasters
People from Cambridge
Living people
Weather presenters